Isoptericola variabilis is a facultative anaerobic and nitrile-hydrolysing bacterium from the genus Isoptericola which has been isolated from the hindgut of the termite Mastotermes darwiniensis in Germany.

References

Further reading

External links
Type strain of Isoptericola variabilis at BacDive -  the Bacterial Diversity Metadatabase	

Micrococcales
Bacteria described in 2002